The California League Most Valuable Player Award (MVP) is an annual award given to the best player in minor league baseball's California League. In 1941, John Jorgensen won the first ever California League MVP Award. After the cancellation of the 2020 season, the league was known as the Low-A West in 2021 before reverting to the California League name in 2022.

First basemen, with 13 winners, have won the most among infielders, followed by shortstops (6), third basemen (5), and second basemen (4). Ten catchers have also won the award. Seven players who won the award were pitchers. Twenty-seven outfielders have won the MVP Award, the most of any position. Six players played during seasons for which position information is unavailable.

Sixteen players from the Brooklyn/Los Angeles Dodgers Major League Baseball (MLB) organization have won the MVP Award, more than any other, followed by the San Diego Padres organization (8); the California/Los Angeles Angels and San Francisco Giants organizations (6); the Minnesota Twins organization (5); the St. Louis Cardinals organization (4); the Kansas City/Oakland Athletics and Milwaukee Brewers organization (3); the Arizona Diamondbacks, Baltimore Orioles, Boston Red Sox, Cincinnati Reds, Colorado Rockies, Pittsburgh Pirates, Seattle Mariners, and Tampa Bay Devil Rays organizations (2); and the Chicago Cubs, Cleveland Indians, Florida Marlins, Houston Astros, and New York Mets organizations (1). Six players competed for teams that were unaffiliated with Major League Baseball organizations.

Key

Winners

References
General

Specific

California League
Minor league baseball trophies and awards
Minor league baseball MVP award winners
Most valuable player awards
Awards established in 1941